Ayu Lestari Putri Gani (born 13 August 1991) is an Indonesian model, beauty influencer, and eyewear designer, known for being the winner of the third season of Asia's Next Top Model, where she represented Indonesia and became the first contestant from Indonesia to enter the top three in the history of the show.

Early life 
Gani was born to ethnic Chinese parents in Surakarta in Central Java, Indonesia, before she moved to Yogyakarta. She studied at Sanata Dharma University majoring in English literature, and received a scholarship from Cincinnati, Ohio, for one year because of her talent in music. After that, she finally moved back to Jakarta and is now studying fashion business at LaSalle College Jakarta.

Pre-show career 
Gani began her career when she joined a modelling competition called "Wajah Femina", where she was awarded "The Most Favorite" title. After that, she walked in several fashion shows around Indonesia and became the icon of Jakarta Fashion Week 2012. She has also been featured in numerous magazine covers, spreads, and interviews like Surface Magazine, Femina Indonesia, Grazia, Nylon, HighEnd, and Harper's Bazaar Singapore as the winner of Asia's Next Top Model (season 3). She has also modeled for Zalora.

Asia's Next Top Model 
Gani was one of the fourteen contestants on the third season of Asia's Next Top Model. She was one of three contestants representing Indonesia, the others being Tahlia Raji and Rani Ramadhany. She received three best photo or first call-outs in weeks 2, 6 and 12 – the second highest number after Monika Sta. Maria with four. She won the competition against Sta. Maria and Aimee Cheng-Bradshaw, winning a Subaru XV STI, a cover of Harper's Bazaar Singapore, a contract Storm Model Management in London and a campaign with TRESemmé.

Post Asia's Next Top Model Career
Gani landed several jobs in Europe for commercial photo shoots and magazine spreads as well as The Body Shop winter campaign. She collaborated with Minimal, a fashion brand in Indonesia. She also became a guest judge of the first cycle of Indonesia's Next Top Model, and being the resident judge from cycle 2.

References

1991 births
Living people
Indonesian people of Chinese descent
Indonesian female models
People from Yogyakarta
Next Top Model winners
Indonesian Christians